Dialakoro may refer to:

Dialakoro, Burkina Faso
Dialakoro, Côte d'Ivoire
Dialakoro, Faranah, Guinea
Dialakoro, Kankan, Guinea
Dialakoro, Mali